The Man with One Red Shoe is a 1985 American comedy film directed by Stan Dragoti and starring Tom Hanks and Dabney Coleman. It is a remake of the 1972 French film The Tall Blond Man with One Black Shoe starring Pierre Richard and Mireille Darc.

Plot
An agent of the United States CIA is arrested in Morocco on drug-smuggling charges. The person behind the smuggling operation is CIA deputy director Burton Cooper, who hopes the resulting scandal will lead to the resignation of CIA Director Ross, and Cooper's promotion to Director. Ross is aware of Cooper's complicity, but when questioned by a special Senate committee about the arrest, Ross tells the committee that he has not reviewed all of the facts of the case. The committee orders a full inquiry and gives Ross 48 hours to present with the proper answers.

Ross devises a plan for Cooper's downfall. Knowing his house has been bugged for sound by Cooper, he purposely leaks a rumor that a man will be arriving at the airport who will clear him of the scandal, and orders his assistant Brown to pick him up. Cooper, desperate to find out who the mystery man is, sends his own agents to follow Brown, who goes to the airport with instructions to pick someone at random from the crowd, leading Cooper and his team on a wild goose chase.

Brown spots a man wearing mismatched shoes descending an escalator and picks him as their random target. The man is concert violinist Richard Drew, whose percussionist friend Morris played a trick on him by hiding one of each pair of his shoes, forcing Richard to wear one business shoe and one red sneaker on his flight home. Cooper takes the bait and starts tracking him.

Richard is completely oblivious to the intelligence operations centered on him, consumed by his own personal problems. He had a fling with Morris's flutist wife Paula, who plays in the same symphony orchestra as the two men; it was brought on by Morris's immaturity and obsession with playing practical jokes on people, Richard being one of them. After eluding them at the airport, Richard is bumped into by Maddy, one of Cooper's operatives, who steals his wallet.

After damaging his tooth with a bag of gag peanuts given to him by Morris, Richard heads home to prepare for a visit to the dentist. While talking on the phone with Morris, Cooper (who has tapped his phone) hears that they are to meet with the Senators. Cooper thinks it is an inquiry with the Senate, but it turns out to be the name of the orchestral softball team for which Richard and Morris play.

While Richard heads to the dentist, Cooper sends his agents out to continue their surveillance, first by having Maddy lead a team to search his apartment for any information and bug it for sound, then by having other agents intercept him at his dentist's office, believing his tooth has microfilm inside.

They learn Richard has traveled the world, including several communist countries. Cooper thinks this is the perfect cover for a spy and starts digging deeper. Soon, they suspect his sheet music is actually a code, and use Department of Defense computers to decipher it. Hoping to learn more, he sends Maddy to seduce Richard and find out what he knows. While Richard is playing a violin composition he wrote for her, Maddy genuinely falls for him. Meanwhile, Morris catches glimpses of the operations of Cooper's agents, leading him to believe he may be going mad.

Ross, meanwhile, simply sits back and watches the antics unfold. Brown is concerned that Richard (the innocent man that he selected at random) may end up being killed as a result of Ross's plan to draw out Cooper, but Ross is only concerned about his career and dismisses Brown's guilty conscience. When one attempt after another fails to yield any usable information, Cooper orders Richard killed and eventually attempts to kill him himself. Richard remains completely oblivious to the plot until Maddy intervenes to save him from Cooper, and testifies in front of the Senate about the plot. Cooper is arrested, Ross is demoted, and Brown becomes Director of the CIA. Morris is committed to a mental institution and Paula calls off her romantic pursuit of Richard, deciding that her husband needs her. Maddy agrees to testify against Cooper in exchange for her freedom, after which she reunites with Richard.

Cast
Tom Hanks as Richard Drew
Dabney Coleman as Burton Cooper
Lori Singer as Maddy
Charles Durning as Ross
Carrie Fisher as Paula
Jim Belushi as Morris
Edward Herrmann as Brown
David Ogden Stiers as Orchestra Conductor
Irving Metzman as Virdon
Tom Noonan as Reese
Gerrit Graham as Carson
David L. Lander as Stemple
Art LaFleur as CIA Agent

Release
The film was considered a box office disappointment. Released by 20th Century Fox in July 1985, it debuted at no.7 at the box office its opening weekend and grossed just $8,645,411 over its short theatrical run.

Reception 
On the review aggregator Rotten Tomatoes, the film has a 47% approval rating based on 15 reviews, with an average rating of 4.7/10. On Metacritic, the film has a weighted average score of 31 out of 100, based on 9 critics, indicating "generally unfavorable reviews."

See also
List of American films of 1985

References

External links

1972 Le Grand Blond avec une Chaussure Noire

1985 films
1980s spy thriller films
American comedy thriller films
American spy comedy films
American spy thriller films
1980s comedy thriller films
1980s spy comedy films
Films directed by Stan Dragoti
Films set in Virginia
Films shot in Virginia
Films set in Washington, D.C.
Films shot in Washington, D.C.
20th Century Fox films
American remakes of French films
Films about the Central Intelligence Agency
Films scored by Thomas Newman
1985 comedy films
1980s English-language films
1980s American films
Films based on works by Francis Veber